The Transgender Legal Defense & Education Fund (TLDEF) is an American civil rights organization that focuses on transgender (LGBT) equality through impact litigation and public policy work.

History
TLDEF was founded in 2003 by Michael Silverman to advocate for transgender rights including health care and restroom access.

Executive Directors

Programs
TLDEF's name change project pairs private attorneys with transgender clients and has helped about 1,500 transgender people change their names.

Notable cases brought by the organization include In re Mathis, the successful 2013 petition of first-grader Coy Mathis to the Colorado Civil Rights Division for the right to use the restroom appropriate to her gender, and Schawe-Lane v. Amazon, in which the U.S. Equal Employment Opportunity Commission found evidence of harassment and discrimination against a husband and wife couple at the Amazon distribution center in Hebron, Kentucky, currently pending in the United States District Court for the Eastern District of Kentucky. The organization recently won rulings from the U.S. Equal Employment opportunity against Walmart in two cases: Robison v. Walmart, and Bost v. Walmart (also in litigation in North Carolina federal court). As a result, the Human Rights Campaign suspended Walmart's rating in its Corporate Equality Index.

References

LGBT political advocacy groups in the United States
Legal advocacy organizations in the United States
Transgender law in the United States
Transgender organizations in the United States
LGBT and education
2003 establishments in the United States